João Nelson de Sousa Caridade Simões (born 4 March 1998) is a Portuguese professional footballer who plays for Associação Académica de Coimbra – O.A.F. as a right back.

Club career
On 25 February 2017, Simões made his professional debut with Académica in a 2016–17 LigaPro match against Cova da Piedade. In August 2019, Simões was loaned out to Berço SC for the 2019-20 season. However, in January 2020, it was reported that he had returned to Académica. On 20 March 2020, he was loaned out to Anadia.

References

External links

Stats and profile at LPFP
João Simões at ZeroZero

1998 births
Sportspeople from Coimbra
Living people
Portuguese footballers
Association football defenders
Liga Portugal 2 players
Associação Académica de Coimbra – O.A.F. players
Anadia F.C. players
Portugal youth international footballers